Hydrastine is an isoquinoline alkaloid which was discovered in 1851 by Alfred P. Durand. Hydrolysis of hydrastine yields hydrastinine, which was patented by Bayer as a haemostatic drug during the 1910s.  It is present in Hydrastis canadensis (thus the name) and other plants of the family Ranunculaceae.

Total synthesis

The first attempt for the total synthesis of hydrastine was reported by Sir Robert Robinson and co-workers in 1931. Following studies where the synthesis of the key lactonic amide intermediate (structure 4 in figure) was the most troublesome, the major breakthrough was achieved in 1981 when J. R. Falck and co-workers reported a four-step total synthesis of hydrastine from simple starting materials. The key step in the Falck synthesis was using a Passerini reaction to construct the lactonic amide intermediate 4.

Starting from a simple phenylbromide variant 1, alkylation reaction with lithium methylisocyanide gives the isocyanide intermediate 2. Reacting isocyanide intermediate 2 with opianic acid 3 initiated the intramolecular Passerini reaction to give the key lactonic amide intermediate 4. The tetrahydro-isoquinolin ring was formed by first a ring-closure reaction under dehydration conditions using POCl3 and then a catalyzed hydrogenation using PtO2 as the catalyst. Finally, hydrastine was synthesized by installing the N-methyl group via reductive amination reaction with formaldehyde.

See also 
 Bicuculline (very similar in structure)

References

External links 
 

Benzylisoquinoline alkaloids
GABAA receptor antagonists
Total synthesis
3-(5,6,7,8-tetrahydro-(1,3)dioxolo(4,5-g)isoquinolin-5-yl)-3H-2-benzofuran-1-ones